Mount Zion Methodist Episcopal Church South, also known as Mount Zion United Methodist Church, is a historic church in Lawrence County, Tennessee, near the Fall River community.

It was built in 1885, replacing a log church that was destroyed in a fire. It was added to the National Register of Historic Places in 1988.

References

United Methodist churches in Tennessee
Churches on the National Register of Historic Places in Tennessee
Churches completed in 1885
19th-century Methodist church buildings in the United States
Buildings and structures in Lawrence County, Tennessee
National Register of Historic Places in Lawrence County, Tennessee